Oxossia albicans is a subshrub in the genus Oxossia (Passifloraceae subfamily Turneroideae). It is native to the wet tropics of eastern Brazil. 

Previously, O. albicans was classified as Turnera, however, recent phylogenetic analyses justified its classification as Oxossia.

References 

Passifloraceae
Flora of Brazil